Colby Ray Covington (born February 22, 1988) is an American professional mixed martial artist who currently competes in the welterweight division of the Ultimate Fighting Championship (UFC), where he is a former Interim UFC Welterweight Champion. As of August 23, 2022, he is #2 in the UFC welterweight rankings.

Early life
Covington was born in Clovis, California on February 22, 1988. The family moved from California to Oregon when he was eight years old. His father was a wrestler during his time at the Oregon Institute of Technology and Southern Oregon University.

Wrestling career 
As a wrestler at Thurston High School in Springfield, Oregon, Covington lettered all four years and won the 171 lb state championship as a senior in 2006. He committed to Arizona State University but his test scores were not up to par, so he went to Iowa Central Community College, where he won the 2007 165 lb national junior college wrestling title as a true freshman with a 34–0 record. His roommate at the time was future UFC champion Jon Jones.

Following his championship season at Iowa Central, Covington transferred to the wrestling program at the University of Iowa. On August 10, 2007, he was arrested for eluding police and driving under the influence, having registered a BAC of 0.255, over three times the legal limit of 0.08. He later said, "That was a real all-time low in my life, something I really wish I could take back." Due to his arrest, Covington was suspended from the Hawkeyes for a year and saw limited time the next season. He looked for a fresh start, and former Hawkeyes coach Jim Zalesky convinced Covington to transfer to Oregon State University.

During his time at OSU, Covington qualified for the NCAA tournament as a junior and as a senior, placing fifth as a senior and earning All-American honors. He also was a two-time Pac-10 Conference champion at 174-pounds. He was cited for fourth-degree assault stemming from an incident on May 23, 2010, in which he was accused of punching two men after a verbal altercation. The Benton County District Attorney's Office did not pursue charges against Covington over the incident.

Covington graduated with a bachelor's degree in sociology in 2011. After graduation, he continued to compete in wrestling and grappling, winning a gold medal at the 2013 FILA Grappling no-gi world championships.

Mixed martial arts career

Early career
After completing his collegiate wrestling career in 2011, Covington was one of a number of athletes recruited by Dan Lambert to American Top Team to improve the gym's wrestling talent. Covington soon began his professional career and compiled a record of 5–0 before signing with the UFC in the summer of 2014.

Ultimate Fighting Championship (2014–present)
Covington made his promotional debut against Anying Wang on August 23, 2014 at UFC Fight Night 48. He won the fight by TKO via punches in the closing seconds of the first round.

Covington fought Wagner Silva on November 8, 2014 at UFC Fight Night 56. He won the fight via submission in the third round.

Covington next faced Mike Pyle on May 23, 2015 at UFC 187, replacing an injured Sean Spencer. He won the fight via unanimous decision.

Covington faced Warlley Alves on December 12, 2015 at UFC 194. He lost the fight via submission in the first round.

Covington was expected to compete against Alex Garcia on June 18, 2016 at UFC Fight Night 89. However, Garcia was pulled from the fight on June 10 for undisclosed reasons and replaced by promotional newcomer Jonathan Meunier. Covington won the fight via submission in the third round.

Covington next faced promotional newcomer Max Griffin on August 20, 2016 at UFC 202. He won the fight via TKO in the third round.

Covington's next bout was against Bryan Barberena on December 17, 2016 at UFC on Fox 22. He won the fight via unanimous decision.

Covington faced Dong Hyun Kim on June 17, 2017 at UFC Fight Night 111. He won the fight via unanimous decision.

As the final fight of his prevailing contract, Covington fought Demian Maia on October 28, 2017 at UFC Fight Night 119. He won the fight via unanimous decision.

Covington fought Rafael dos Anjos on June 9, 2018 at UFC 225 for the Interim UFC Welterweight Championship. He won the fight via unanimous decision.

Covington was briefly linked to a title unification bout with the then champion Tyron Woodley on September 8, 2018, at UFC 228. However, Covington was unable to compete on that date due to recent nasal surgery. As a result, UFC officials turned their attention to arranging a bout between Woodley and Darren Till to fill the headlining spot. In turn, promotional officials indicated on July 24 that Covington would be stripped of the Interim UFC Welterweight Championship, once the bout between Woodley and Till took place.

Covington returned to face Robbie Lawler in the main event of UFC on ESPN 5 on August 3, 2019. He won the fight via a lopsided unanimous decision, setting a record for the most strikes thrown in a UFC bout, with 541 strikes.

Covington faced Kamaru Usman for the UFC Welterweight Championship on December 14, 2019 at UFC 245. Covington broke his jaw in the third round, and would be finished by technical knockout in the fifth round. This fight earned him his first post-fight bonus in the UFC for Fight of the Night. Going into the final round, one judge had Covington winning 39–37, another had it tied at 38–38, and the other had it 39–37 in favor of Usman.

After a long-lasting, public feud and trash talking between Covington and other American Top Team members – most notably Dustin Poirier, Jorge Masvidal and Joanna Jędrzejczyk – Covington eventually parted ways with his first mixed martial arts gym in May 2020.

Covington headlined UFC Fight Night 178 against his long-time rival Tyron Woodley on September 19, 2020. After dominating his opponent for four rounds, the bout was called as a technical knockout when Woodley suffered a rib injury.

Covington rematched Kamaru Usman for the UFC Welterweight Championship on November 6, 2021 at UFC 268. Despite a close bout, Covington lost via unanimous decision.

Covington faced Jorge Masvidal on March 5, 2022, at UFC 272. He won the fight via unanimous decision. This fight earned him the Fight of the Night award.

Fighting style 
A NCAA Division I All-American and a two-time Pac-10 champion as a collegiate wrestler, Covington heavily utilizes wrestling and grappling in mixed martial arts. He aims to take his opponents down and control them on the ground, where he looks for ground-and-pound as well as submissions. If unsuccessful on his initial take down attempt, he will chain it into further take down attempts, forcing his opponent to defend and tiring them out in the process. Covington is renowned for his cardio and is capable of maintaining an intense pace over five rounds.

While standing, Covington primarily fights out of a southpaw stance, and his striking arsenal features a variety of punches and kicks. He often purposely overextends on his punches to transition from striking to a takedown attempt. His stand-up game focuses on volume and forward pressure. In his win over Robbie Lawler in 2019, Covington threw 541 strikes, which was a UFC record until surpassed by Max Holloway's 746 attempted strikes in his fight against Calvin Kattar in 2021.

Professional wrestling appearances
In August 2017, Covington began making appearances in Impact Wrestling (known at the time as Global Force Wrestling), representing American Top Team, where he got involved in the storyline with Lashley. Throughout the month, Lashley was conflicted on whether he should combine his two careers together, or quit wrestling and focus on his MMA career; he would eventually side with ATT. On August 17, at Destination X, some members of ATT were ringside to support Lashley for his match against Matt Sydal. Post-match, Covington attacked referee Brian Hebner with a rear-naked choke, which Lashley had to call off, before he and ATT left the arena. On the August 24 episode of Impact! (taped August 17), they were again at ringside to support Lashley in a twenty-man gauntlet match for the GFW Impact World Heavyweight Championship, which was eventually won by Eli Drake. On 5 November, at Bound for Glory, Covington appeared as a cornerman, as Lashley and King Mo defeated Moose and Stephan Bonnar in a six sides of steel match. In the build-up to the event, he hired Stevie Richards to be his strength and conditioning coach. The event marked Covington's final appearance with the stable.

In February 2018 and in the midst of his feud with Tyron Woodley, Covington appeared at a WrestlePro event, in conjunction with Impact. His only professional wrestling match to date saw him squash an unidentified wrestler portraying a parody of Woodley, under the ring name TyQuill Woodley.

Public image

Politics
Covington is an outspoken supporter of the Republican Party and former President Donald Trump. After winning the Interim UFC Welterweight Championship, he stated he wanted to visit Trump at the White House to present him with the title, which he did on August 2, 2018. Trump phoned to congratulate Covington during his post-fight interview following his win over Tyron Woodley.  Covington dedicated his win over Woodley to first responders and the military and criticized Black Lives Matter and LeBron James. Woodley had spoken about his support for the Black Lives Matter movement leading up to the fight.

Controversies
He has described himself as the "super villain" of the UFC and will often try to upset people with brazen trash talking. Following his 2017 bout with Demian Maia at São Paulo, Brazil, he called the country a "dump" and referred to the Brazilian crowd as "filthy animals" in the post-fight interview. In an interview with Candace Owens, Covington said that his "act" was a response to the UFC threatening to cut him before the Maia fight and stated the "Filthy Animals" speech "saved his career." Covington further embraced his villain status before his 2019 main event encounter with Robbie Lawler at UFC on ESPN 5. He used the WWE entrance theme of professional wrestler Kurt Angle—which is regularly punctuated with crowd chants of "You suck!"—as his entrance music; Angle had given Covington permission to use the theme. With two of Trump's sons, Donald Jr. and Eric cageside for the fight, the crowd performed the "You suck!" chants during Covington's entrance.

After his win over Lawler, Covington stated; "Let’s talk about the lesson we learned tonight that Robbie should have learned from his good buddy Matt Hughes. You stay off the tracks when the train is coming through, junior, doesn’t matter if it’s the Trump train or the Colby train, get out the way!" during his post-fight interview. This was in reference to a near-fatal accident Hughes suffered in 2017, where he was permanently damaged when his truck was struck by a train at a rail crossing. Despite being criticized by the media, Covington refused to apologize, explaining that "the guy’s done some pretty crappy stuff, he’s got lawsuits against his family, against his brother, I just said the truth, I’m honest. I’m a little bit brutally honest sometimes and people can’t handle it."

Covington continued his trash-talking in the lead up to the Kamaru Usman fight at UFC 245. During a press conference, he said that Usman gave Glenn Robinson, Usman's long-time coach who died in 2018, "a heart attack from all those years you were ducking me," and that Robinson would be "watching from hell on Dec. 14."

On September 19, 2020, Covington issued a public $100,000 challenge to any Jiu-Jitsu competitor who would be willing to compete against his Judo and BJJ coach, Daniel Valverde. Gordon Ryan accepted the challenge and offered $200,000 of his own money to arrange the match, although it never came to fruition.

In March 2021, Covington created controversy by insinuating that he had a sexual relationship with fellow UFC fighter Polyana Viana and that this was part of the reason why he turned down a fight with Leon Edwards at UFC Fight Night: Edwards vs. Muhammad. Viana herself had earlier claimed that she and Colby were "just friends" and that she already had a boyfriend when addressing rumors that the two of them were in a relationship. After Covington's comments, Viana gave the following statement through her social media: "I have never given room for any kind of comment or judgment about my personal life, but it is not for me to judge the person’s attitude. I feel sorry for those who act so low to try to promote themselves. It is revolting."

Alleged attack by Jorge Masvidal
On March 22, 2022, it was reported that Covington was allegedly assaulted outside of a Miami Beach Papi Steak restaurant by UFC rival Jorge Masvidal, whom Covington had defeated previously at UFC 272 a few weeks prior. Covington allegedly suffered a broken tooth from two punches to the face. Masvidal was arrested and charged with aggravated battery, and criminal mischief.

Championships and accomplishments

Mixed martial arts
Ultimate Fighting Championship
Interim UFC Welterweight Championship (One time)
Fight of the Night (Two times) '

Grappling
FILA 
FILA 77 kg No-Gi Grappling World Championship – (gold medal) (2013)

Amateur wrestling
National Collegiate Athletic Association
NCAA Division I All-American out of Oregon State University  (2011)
Pac-10 174 lb Conference Championship out of Oregon State University  (2010, 2011)
National Junior College Athletic Association
NJCAA 165 lb National Championship out of Iowa Central Community College  (2007)
NJCAA All-American out of Iowa Central Community College  (2007)
Oregon State Activities Association
OSAA 171 lb State Championship out of Thurston High School  (2006)

Mixed martial arts record
 

|-
|Win
|align=center|17–3
|Jorge Masvidal
|Decision (unanimous)
|UFC 272
|
|align=center|5
|align=center|5:00
|Las Vegas, Nevada, United States
|
|-
|Loss
|align=center|16–3
|Kamaru Usman
|Decision (unanimous)
|UFC 268
|
|align=center|5
|align=center|5:00
|New York City, New York, United States
|
|-
|Win
|align=center|16–2
|Tyron Woodley 
|TKO (rib injury)
|UFC Fight Night: Covington vs. Woodley
|
|align=center|5
|align=center|1:19
|Las Vegas, Nevada, United States
|
|-
|Loss
|align=center|15–2
|Kamaru Usman
|TKO (punches)
|UFC 245 
|
|align=center|5
|align=center|4:10
|Las Vegas, Nevada, United States
| 
|-
|Win
|align=center| 15–1
|Robbie Lawler
|Decision (unanimous)
|UFC on ESPN: Covington vs. Lawler
|
|align=center|5
|align=center|5:00
|Newark, New Jersey, United States
|
|-
|Win
|align=center|14–1
|Rafael dos Anjos
|Decision (unanimous)
|UFC 225 
|
|align=center|5
|align=center|5:00
|Chicago, Illinois, United States
|
|-
|Win
|align=center|13–1
|Demian Maia
|Decision (unanimous)
|UFC Fight Night: Brunson vs. Machida
|
|align=center|3
|align=center|5:00
|São Paulo, Brazil
|
|-
|Win
|align=center|12–1
|Dong Hyun Kim
|Decision (unanimous)
|UFC Fight Night: Holm vs. Correia
|
|align=center|3
|align=center|5:00
|Kallang, Singapore
|
|-
|Win
|align=center|11–1
|Bryan Barberena
|Decision (unanimous)
|UFC on Fox: VanZant vs. Waterson
|
|align=center|3
|align=center|5:00
|Sacramento, California, United States
|
|-
|Win
|align=center|10–1
|Max Griffin
|TKO (punches)
|UFC 202 
|
|align=center|3
|align=center|2:18
|Las Vegas, Nevada, United States
|  
|-
|Win
|align=center|9–1
|Jonathan Meunier
|Submission (rear-naked choke)
|UFC Fight Night: MacDonald vs. Thompson
|
|align=center|3
|align=center|0:54
|Ottawa, Ontario, Canada
|
|-
|Loss
|align=center|8–1
|Warlley Alves
|Submission (guillotine choke)
|UFC 194
|
|align=center|1
|align=center|1:26
|Las Vegas, Nevada, United States
|   
|-
|Win
|align=center|8–0
|Mike Pyle
|Decision (unanimous)
|UFC 187
|
|align=center|3
|align=center|5:00
|Las Vegas, Nevada, United States
|
|-
|Win
|align=center|7–0
|Wagner Silva
|Submission (rear-naked choke)
|UFC Fight Night: Shogun vs. Saint Preux
|
|align=center|3
|align=center|3:26
|Uberlândia, Brazil
|
|-
|Win
|align=center|6–0
|Wang Anying
|TKO (submission to punches)
|UFC Fight Night: Bisping vs. Le
|
|align=center|1
|align=center|4:50
|Macau, SAR, China
|
|-
|Win
|align=center|5–0
|Jay Ellis
|Submission (arm-triangle choke)
|AFC 21: The Return
|
|align=center|1
|align=center|2:49
|Hollywood, Florida, United States
|
|-
|Win
|align=center|4–0
|Jose Caceres
|Decision (unanimous)
|CFA 12: Sampo vs. Thao
|
|align=center|3
|align=center|5:00
|Coral Gables, Florida, United States
|
|-
|Win
|align=center|3–0
|Jason Jackson
|Decision (unanimous)
|Fight Time 10: It's Personal
|
|align=center|3
|align=center|5:00
|Fort Lauderdale, Florida, United States
|
|-
|Win
|align=center|2–0
|David Hayes
|Submission (arm-triangle choke)
|Fight Time 9: MMA Explosion
|
|align=center|2
|align=center|1:42
|Fort Lauderdale, Florida, United States
|
|-
|Win
|align=center|1–0
|Chris Ensley
|TKO (submission to knee injury)
|Midtown Throwdown 3
|
|align=center|1
|align=center|1:21
|Eugene, Oregon, United States
|

NCAA record

! colspan="8"| NCAA Championships Matches
|-
!  Res.
!  Record
!  Opponent
!  Score
!  Date
!  Event
|-
! style=background:white colspan=6 |2011 NCAA Championships 5th at 174 lbs
|-
|Win
|7–4
|align=left|Christopher Henrich
|style="font-size:88%"|3–2
|style="font-size:88%" rowspan=7|March 17–19, 2011
|style="font-size:88%" rowspan=7|2011 NCAA Division I National Championships
|-
|Loss
|6–4
|align=left|Mack Lewnes
|style="font-size:88%"|5–12
|-
|Win
|6–3
|align=left|Mike Letts
|style="font-size:88%"|6–1
|-
|Win
|5–3
|align=left|Ryan Patrovich
|style="font-size:88%"|3–2
|-
|Loss
|4–3
|align=left|Chris Henrich
|style="font-size:88%"|5–7
|-
|Win
|4–2
|align=left|Jacob Swartz
|style="font-size:88%"|8–2
|-
|Win
|3–2
|align=left|Mike Dessino
|style="font-size:88%"|MD 18–6
|-
! style=background:white colspan=6 |2010 NCAA Championships DNP at 174 lbs
|-
|Loss
|2–2
|align=left|Ben Bennet
|style="font-size:88%"|Fall
|style="font-size:88%" rowspan=4|March 18–20, 2010
|style="font-size:88%" rowspan=4|2010 NCAA Division I National Championships
|-
|Loss
|2–1
|align=left|Mack Lewnes
|style="font-size:88%"|OT 2–4
|-
|Win
|2–0
|align=left|Luke Manuel
|style="font-size:88%"|OT 3–1
|-
|Win
|1–0
|align=left|Jim Rednick
|style="font-size:88%"|MD 10–1
|-

See also
 List of current UFC fighters
 List of male mixed martial artists

References

External links
Official UFC Profile

Living people
1988 births
American male mixed martial artists
Mixed martial artists from Oregon
Oregon State Beavers wrestlers
People from Springfield, Oregon
Wrestlers from Oregon
Oregon Republicans
Florida Republicans
Welterweight mixed martial artists
Mixed martial artists utilizing collegiate wrestling
Ultimate Fighting Championship male fighters
Iowa Central Tritons wrestlers
Ultimate Fighting Championship champions